Alec Roth (1948) is an English composer. He is best known for his collaboration with Vikram Seth to produce the opera Arion and the Dolphin in 1994 based on the myth of Arion.

Roth studied music from 1976 as a mature student at Durham University, having previously completed a science degree at the University of Nottingham. He earned a doctorate from Durham in 1986. His thesis was entitled New composition for Javanese gamelan.

Works, editions and recordings
 California Songbook - settings of poems written by Vikram Seth when he was living on the West Coast of the US
 Sometime I Sing - settings for solo voice and guitar, including: My Lute and I; Dark Night; 3 Night Songs; Autumnal; English Folk Songs; Lights Out. Mark Padmore, Morgan Szymanski piano. Signum Records, 2013
 Earthrise (2009) - A choral work inspired by the photograph of the same name taken from lunar orbit in 1968, considering the positive and negative sides of the human race's mastery and control of the world. The work was commissioned by the UK choir Ex Cathedra for the 40th anniversary of its founding, which was in the same year (2009) as the 40th anniversary of the Moon landing. It was written for 40-part choir, on the model of Thomas Tallis's famous Spem in alium.  Earthrise also includes an example of eye music - in the central two pages of the work, the music's layout spells out the word 'ecce' (the Latin for 'behold') as the choir sings the same word. 
 A Time to Dance (2012) - An oratorio for soloists, choir and orchestra on the theme of the seasons of the year, the times of day and the stages of the human lifespan. Hyperion Records, 2016

References

External links
Alec Roth homepage

English composers
1948 births
Living people
Alumni of the University of Nottingham
Alumni of Hatfield College, Durham
Gamelan
English male composers
20th-century British composers
21st-century British composers
20th-century British male musicians
21st-century British male musicians